Bereźnica Wyżna  (Berezhnytsia Vyzhnia) is a village in the administrative district of Gmina Solina, within Lesko County, Subcarpathian Voivodeship, in south-eastern Poland.

The village has a population of 230.

References

Villages in Lesko County